is a Japanese manga written and illustrated by Fumiko Fumi and published by Tokuma Shoten on the Ryu Comics imprint on September 13, 2011. It was adapted into a live action youth erotic science fiction film directed by Kōta Yoshida and release on June 28, 2014.

Plot
An alien female comes to the Earth, dressed as a schoolgirl, under the name of Suzuki-san, to get pregnant. She gets a boyfriend, but somehow gets pregnant from a teacher. Once she gives birth to a baby, she says goodbye to the teacher and to the boyfriend, and is pulled to the saucer, by which she flies back to her planet.

Cast
Naoho Ichihashi
Yumi Ishikawa
Yūkichi Kobayashi
Noriyuki Fuse

References

External links
Official manga website 
Official film website 

2010s erotic films
2010s science fiction films
2011 manga
Live-action films based on manga
Films directed by Kōta Yoshida
Japanese science fiction films
Manga adapted into films
Seinen manga
Tokuma Shoten manga
2010s Japanese films